Bolshaya Kokshaga Nature Reserve is a nature reserve in Kilemarsky District and Medvedevsky District, Mari-El, Russia.

References 

1993 establishments in Russia
Protected areas established in 1993